La Ballade en vieil langage françoys is a poem by François Villon. Following on from the Ballade des dames du temps jadis and the Ballade des seigneurs du temps jadis, it closes the triptych of ballads which occupies the beginning of his Testament.

It is written in “vieille langage françoys”, that is to say in old French. But Villon speaks Middle French. He therefore uses a language that his contemporaries no longer practiced, and that he himself knew only poorly (See François Villon, Œuvres, par Louis Thuasne, Tome II: Commentaire et notes, Éditeur: Auguste Picard, 1923, p. 164, "Other ballad" section).

Title 
Several editions indicate Autre ballade à ce propos en vieil langage françois, which suggests that it is related to the two preceding ones. The author himself does not indicate a title.

Theme 
As in the Ballade des dames du temps jadis and the Ballade des seigneurs du temps jadis, François Villon speaks of the traditional theme, in poetry, of the tempus fugit, that is to say of time which flees, as well as of ubi sunt, that is to say of the question: "Where are they?", evoking the deceased of a distant past.

The translation of the title of the book Gone with the Wind by Margaret Mitchell into Autant en emporte le vent was found by the publisher Jean Paulhan in the refrain of this Ballade en vieil langage françoys.

Shape 
It is a ballad, a frequent form in Villon's work. Using the octosyllable, it obeys the following rules of composition :

 three eighths followed by a quatrain named dispatch ;
 three rhymes in A, B and C ;
 the rhymes are arranged in ABABBCBC in the eights and in BCBC in the dispatch.

Text and transcript 
Here is the text, its transcription in modern French and in English :

Notes and references 

French-language poems
Poetry by François Villon
French poems
15th-century poems